Sympycnus elegans is a species of fly in the genus Sympycnus.

References

Sympycninae
Insects described in 1932
Taxa named by Octave Parent